Jack Hunter-Spivey (born 11 May 1995) is a British Paralympic table tennis player. He won gold at the 2022 Commonwealth Games in Birmingham, and bronze at the 2020 Summer Paralympics, both in the Men's individual class 5 event.

Personal life
He grew up in the Anfield suburb of Liverpool and is a supporter of Liverpool F.C. He has appeared as a guest on The Anfield Wrap.

References

External links
 

1995 births
Living people
British male table tennis players
Paralympic table tennis players of Great Britain
Paralympic bronze medalists for Great Britain
Paralympic medalists in table tennis
Table tennis players at the 2016 Summer Paralympics
Table tennis players at the 2020 Summer Paralympics
Medalists at the 2020 Summer Paralympics
Sportspeople from Liverpool
Sportspeople from Sheffield
Commonwealth Games gold medallists for England
Commonwealth Games medallists in table tennis
Table tennis players at the 2022 Commonwealth Games
Medallists at the 2022 Commonwealth Games